Smith v Parsons ((187/07) [2010] ZASCA 39 (30 March 2010)) is an important case in South African succession law concerning whether a suicide note should be accepted as an amendment to the deceased's will.

The deceased, Walter Percival Smith, had validly executed a will in 2003 making his son, Jeremy Alan Smith, his sole heir. On 25 February 2007 he committed suicide, leaving a note on the kitchen counter under a crucifix. The suicide note said that his girlfriend, Heather Wendy Smith was to have the house they had lived in, which he expected her to sell, the proceeds from which should be sufficient for her needs, and that he authorized his bank to give her immediate access to an account containing R579,000. It directed that the residue of his estate was to go to his son Jeremy as stated in his will. The lower court held that the suicide note was not intended as a codicil to the will. The Supreme Court of Appeal overturned the lower court's ruling and ordered that the suicide note be treated as a codicil.

See also 
 South African succession law

References 

Law of succession in South Africa
South African case law
2010 in case law
2010 in South African law